Diaspis is a genus of scales and mealybugs in the family Diaspididae. There are at least 50 described species in Diaspis.

Species

References

Further reading

 
 
 
 

Sternorrhyncha genera
Diaspidini